Ernst Christl (born 31 March 1964) is a German former cyclist. He competed in the team time trial at the 1988 Summer Olympics.

References

External links
 

1964 births
Living people
German male cyclists
Olympic cyclists of West Germany
Cyclists at the 1988 Summer Olympics
Cyclists from Munich